Rebel Road is the tenth solo album by vocalist/keyboardist/saxophonist Edgar Winter. It was released on July 8, 2008 by Airline Records.  The album features lead and solo guitar work by Slash on the single "Rebel Road", vocals and harmonica by Clint Black on "The Power of Positive Drinking" and "On the Horns of a Dilemma", and lead and solo guitar by Edgar's brother Johnny Winter on "Rockin' the Blues".
Winter dedicated "The Closer I Get" to his wife, Monique Winter, and "Peace and Love" to Ringo Starr.

Track listing
All songs written by Edgar Winter, Curt Cuomo & James Zota Baker; except "Rebel Road" (Edgar Winter, Curt Cuomo, James Zota Baker, Jake Hooker), "The Closer I Get" (Edgar Winter) and "Texas Tornado" (Edgar Winter) 
 "Rebel Road" (with Slash) – 4:12
 "Eye on You" – 3:49  
 "The Power of Positive Drinkin'" (with Clint Black) – 3:47
 "Freedom" – 3:57
 "Rockin' the Blues" (with Johnny Winter) – 5:01
 "The Closer I Get" – 4:39
 "I'd Do It Again" – 4:31
 "Texas Tornado" – 4:50
 "Peace and Love" – 4:47
 "On the Horns of a Dilemma" (with Clint Black) – 3:13
 "Oh No No" – 3:40

Personnel
 Edgar Winter : vocals, saxophone, piano, organ, synthesizer and percussion
 Curt Cuomo : vocals, drums
 James Zota Baker : guitar, vocals
 Doug Rappoport : guitar, vocals 
 Dean Parks : acoustic guitar
 Koko Powell : bass, vocals 
 Mark Meadows : bass
 Dave Carpenter : bass
 Matt Bissonette : bass
 Abe Laboriel Jr. : drums
 Matt Laug : drums
 Gary Novak : drums
 Pete Maloney : drums
 Jimmy Paxson : drums
 Cameron Stone : Cello

Special guests 
 Slash : guitar solo on Rebel Road
 Clint Black : vocals and harmonica on The Power of Positive Drinking and On the Horns of a Dilemma 
 Johnny Winter : lead and solo guitar on Rockin' the Blues

Technical staff 
Ross Hogarth – Engineer/Mixer 
Rob Jacobs – Engineer/Mixer
Erik Ron – Engineer/Vocals

References

External links
 [ Edgar Winter's Rebel Road at Allmusic.com]

Edgar Winter albums
2008 albums